Ricardo Botelho is a Brazilian mixed martial artist. He competed in the Lightweight division.

Mixed martial arts record

|-
| Loss
| align=center| 3-2
| Caol Uno
| TKO (submission to punches)
| VTJ 1998: Vale Tudo Japan 1998
| 
| align=center| 3
| align=center| 2:03
| Urayasu, Chiba, Japan
| 
|-
| Win
| align=center| 3-1
| Joel Gerson
| Decision (split)
| Shooto: Las Grandes Viajes 5
| 
| align=center| 3
| align=center| 5:00
| Tokyo, Japan
| 
|-
| Win
| align=center| 2-1
| Masato Fujiwara
| Decision (unanimous)
| Shooto: Las Grandes Viajes 1
| 
| align=center| 3
| align=center| 5:00
| Tokyo, Japan
| 
|-
| Loss
| align=center| 1-1
| Rumina Sato
| Submission (heel hook)
| Shooto: Reconquista 1
| 
| align=center| 3
| align=center| 1:24
| Tokyo, Japan
| 
|-
| Win
| align=center| 1-0
| Cristiano Franca
| Submission (rear naked choke)
| UVF 4: Universal Vale Tudo Fighting 4
| 
| align=center| 1
| align=center| 3:58
| Brazil
|

See also
 List of male mixed martial artists

References

External links
 

Year of birth missing (living people)
Living people
Brazilian male mixed martial artists
Lightweight mixed martial artists